The Directorate-General for Internal Market, Industry, Entrepreneurship and SMEs (DG GROW) is a Directorate-General of the European Commission. The Enterprise Directorate-General works on creating an environment in which European firms can thrive. The improvement of the business environment is to lead to a growth in productivity and subsequently create the jobs and wealth necessary to achieve the objectives set by the European Council in Lisbon in March 2000.

In 2022 the Commissioner was Thierry Breton and the Director-General was Kerstin Jorna.

See also
 European Commissioner for Internal Market
 Aho report
 Sectoral e-Business Watch

References

External links
Directorate General for Internal Market, Industry, Entrepreneurship and SMEs

Enterprise and Industr